Jane Hurlstone (née Coral; died 2 October 1858) was a Scottish watercolour artist and vegetarianism activist. She has been cited as one of the founding members of the RSPCA. Hurlstone was a supporter of Owenism, animal welfare and Italian nationalism.

Biography 
Hurlstone was born in Scotland. She married Frederick Yeates Hurlstone, a fellow artist, in 1836. She exhibited some watercolour drawings and portraits at the Royal Academy and the Society of British Artists; from 1850 to 1856 she contributed to the latter exhibition only fancy subjects in oil-colours.

Hurlstone died in 1858; she was survived by her husband and two sons, one of whom was also an artist.

References 

 Attribution

 

Year of birth unknown
1858 deaths
19th-century Scottish women artists
Animal welfare workers
Italian nationalists
Organization founders
Owenites
Utopian socialists
Scottish activists
Scottish socialists
Scottish vegetarianism activists
Scottish watercolourists
Scottish women painters
Women watercolorists